Jordan Augier (born 14 November 1994) is a Saint Lucian Olympic swimmer. He represented his country at the 2016 Summer Olympics in the Men's 50 metre freestyle event where he ranked at #45 with a time of 23.28 seconds. He did not advance to the semifinals. Jordan furthered his education at The University of Tampa.

References 

1994 births
Living people
Saint Lucian male swimmers
Swimmers at the 2016 Summer Olympics
Olympic swimmers of Saint Lucia
Swimmers at the 2015 Pan American Games
Pan American Games competitors for Saint Lucia
Swimmers at the 2014 Commonwealth Games
Commonwealth Games competitors for Saint Lucia